Sufrin is a surname. Notable people with the surname include:
Carolyn Sufrin, American medical anthropologist and obstetrician-gynecologist
Eileen Tallman Sufrin (1913-1999), Canadian author and labour activist
Gerald Sufrin, American urologist
Solomon Sufrin (1881–1931), American politician